Emani Sankara Sastry (23 September 1922 – 1987), was a renowned Veena player of Carnatic music.

Life sketch
Emani Sankara Sastry was born on 23 September 1922 in Draksharamam, India. He came from a family of celebrated classical musicians. His father Vainika Bhooshana Veena Acharya Emani Achyutarama Sastri, a famed vainika and sastragna was a contemporary of Sangameshwara Sastri and Veena Venkata Romainiah Das of Andhra.

The prodigious training he had from a young age under his unsparing father was reflected in abundance in his tuneful, melodious and technique perfect concerts. His graceful playing on the veena in strictly traditional style evoked a reverential listening. Emani gave concerts throughout the length and breadth of India. His participation in East-West music festivals, Tansen festival, Vishnu Digambar festival, and other prestigious music conferences won him distinction in the field of music.

Emani played duets with Ustad Abdul Halim Jaffer Khan, Pandit Ravi Shankar, and Pandit Gopal Krishan (on vichitra veena) evoking enthusiastic responses from the North Indian listeners. After completing his education from Andhra University, he joined the famous Gemini Studios at Madras, where he was the music director for more than ten years. He composed tunes based on novel techniques and directed music for hit films such as Mangla, Sansar, Bahut Din Huwe, Vindhyarani, Nishan, Mr. Sampat and English version of Chandralekha. His own compositions of keerthanas, javalis and bhajans can be frequently heard in his solo concerts. His operas in Hindi and regional languages are also very popular. Emani joined All India Radio in 1959 as producer of music at Madras. Soon he rose to the position of director and composer of national orchestra and chief producer of music. He presented over the broadcasting network a number of classical, thematic orchestral compositions and folk melodies bringing out the special tonal qualities of Indian instruments and synthesised musical patterns with a distinctive Emani touch. Emani was also associated with cultural and academic organisations. He was the asthaan vidwan (court musician) of Tirumala Tirupati Devasthanams, member of the university grants committee – to advise on music and member of the expert committee at Madras Music Academy. He was also designated founder chairman of the committee to select candidates for scholarships of the education ministry for Carnatic music, was a member to select film awards (national), member of the central Sangeet Natak Akademi to select candidates for the national awards.

Emani introduced a number of budding young singers to the musical world. Prominent among them was playback singer P.B. Srinivos who later went on to make a name for himself as a singer in Tamil, Kannada & Telugu films.

Honors and awards
To quote: Vainika Sikhamani, Vainika Siromani, Veena Gana Gandhrava, Ganarupa Kalasaraswathi, Veena Vadanatatvegna, Gandhrava Kalanidhi, Gana Kala Dhara, Veena Chakravarthi, Vallaki Vallabha. He was also conferred with the title of Maha Mahopadhyaya, which was conferred on a South Indian musician for the first time. He was given the Sangeet Natak Akademi Award in 1973, Sahitya Kala Parishad award, Padma Shri and Doctorate of Andhra University. Many other titles were conferred upon him.

The all India felicitation committee under the patronship of the Vice-President of India honoured him by conferring upon him the title chaturdandi panditaha for rendering his services for the cause of music.

The raga Sankarabharanam played by him on the veena won him the ASIAN ROSTRUM AWARD for the most outstanding number for the year 1973. The rostrum was held under the patronage of UNESCO, at Alam Atta, Soviet Union wherein eminent artists from thirty nations took part.
In appreciation of his opulent music lovers of Poughkeepsie, New York bestowed upon him the title "VEENA VIRTUOSO" on 12 October 1953. He was invited to participate in the "PAN ASIATIC MUSIC AND DANCE FESTIVAL" at Rome during July 1980.

His major monumental works in orchestration:

1.	Adarsa sikhararohanam – An orchestral composition based on the theme of the conquest of Everest in which he used six veenas. The force proved a unique experience to lovers of creative music and to others it opened up new vistas of musical utterance.

2.	Swara tarangini – An orchestral composition in which he employed numerous sounds that gradually crystallise into musical swaras suggesting the origin of sound and music.

3.	Ragam Thanam Pallavi – an orchestral composition based on the classical raga Todi. It was an experiment first of its kind in classical music which won the appreciation of musicians and the listeners.

4.	Indu – a composition based on the first six ragas of the first chakra of the melakarta scheme of the great Venkatamakhin.

5.	Bharata jyoti – a thematic musical composition on late Pandit Nehru and his achievements.

6.	Saumya pursh – a musical composition on late Mahatma Gandhiji's ideals.

7.	Brmara vinyas – a thematic composition depicting a day in the life of a bee, which won him laurels at the prix Italia.

Admiration
He won the admiration of the world known violinist Yehudi Menuhin and at his special invitation he participated in the festival of international music council at Paris on 8 January 1974. He enthralled people by his concert of the veena which was classed as the concert of the century by discerning reviewers. He was one of the most outstanding artists constantly in demand in India and abroad. He contributed a number of recordings on A.I.R. and two long-playing records for U.N.E.S.C.O. for release all over the world.

A great guru he was, Emani has to his credit disciples well known in the field of music. Among them are:
His daughter Emani Kalyani Lakshminarayana who is a regular performer for Doordarshan & All India Radio has been performing in India as well as abroad.
Emani Kalyani, ably trained in veena by her father, has acquired a high degree of proficiency and accomplishments through her serious interest and dedicated pursuit. Her solo concerts in the radio and public concerts accompanying her father have won worldwide acclaim justifying the hopes pinned on her for preserving the heritage.
Disciple Chitti Babu carved a good reputation as a Veena player.
Other disciples of Emani are: V. Saraswathi, M. Y. Kama Sastry, S. N. Satyamurthy, S.N. Ramachandran and Vishwanathan. Palagummi Viswanadham, renowned composer of light music, is his first disciple.
His second daughter is a well-known ghazal singer Devi Murthy, and has won great acclaim in the field of ghazal singing; she has been giving public concerts in India as well as abroad, winning the hearts of viewers and listeners...

References

External links
Shri Emani Shankara Sastry – Artist page on Answers.com

Recipients of the Sangeet Natak Akademi Award
Recipients of the Padma Shri in arts
1922 births
1987 deaths
Saraswati veena players
20th-century Indian musicians